Thomas Skeeles Fryer  (30 June 1793 — 1 September 1861) was an English first-class cricketer.

The son of Daniel Dryer and Elizabeth Skeeles, he was born at Chatteris in June 1793. By profession, he was a brewer and later a brickmaker. Fryer was appointed Sheriff of Cambridgeshire and Huntingdonshire in January 1826. He had a keen interest in cricket and was president of Chatteris Cricket Club; during his presidency the club was ambitious and engaged many of the leading Cambridgeshire cricketers of the time, including Daniel Hayward, Robert Glasscock and Francis Fenner. Fryer himself played first-class cricket for Cambridge Town Club twice against the Marylebone Cricket Club (MCC) in 1832. The first of these was played at Lord's, while the second was played at Chatteris. However, Fryer failed to score any runs in the two innings in which he batted. In later life he was a deputy lieutenant for Cambridgeshire and Huntingdonshire, and was additionally a justice of the peace for the two counties. In August 1859, he was declared bankrupt. Fryer died in September 1861 at Hemingford Abbots, Huntingdonshire.

References

External links

1793 births
1861 deaths
People from Chatteris
English brewers
High Sheriffs of Cambridgeshire and Huntingdonshire
English cricketers
Cambridge Town Club cricketers
Deputy Lieutenants of Cambridgeshire
English justices of the peace